MTB, fully spelled as Magandang Tanghali Bayan and Masayang Tanghali Bayan, and later known as MTB Ang Saya Saya ( or ), is a Philippine noontime variety show broadcast by ABS-CBN. The show aired from Mondays to Saturdays and was also broadcast worldwide through The Filipino Channel.

The show was known for its many formats and host changes over the years that it was broadcast. Magandang Tanghali Bayan – the original run of MTB – is the fourth longest running noontime show of ABS-CBN after It's Showtime (2009–present), Eat Bulaga! (1989–1995) and Wowowee (2005–2010), staying on air for 4 years, 2 months and 22 days from 1998 to 2003. Other MTB incarnations such as Masayang Tanghali Bayan (2003–2004) and MTB Ang Saya Saya (2004–2005) stayed on air for around one year each, before Wowowee eventually took over. Including all of its iterations however, MTB was ABS-CBN's longest running daily noontime show until It's Showtime surpassed its run in 2016.

History

Magandang Tanghali Bayan/Esep-Esep (1998–2003)
As ABS-CBN decided to axe "'Sang Linggo nAPO Sila", the management decided to produce 2 noontime variety shows, one airing daily and one airing weekly.  The new daily noontime show Magandang Tanghali Bayan started premiering on November 30, 1998, airing from 12:00nn to 1:30pm, Philippine time. The weekly noontime show, APO Hiking Society's "Sabado Live" occupied the Saturday timeslot. Original hosts of "MTB" are Randy Santiago, John Estrada, Willie Revillame, Christine Jacob-Sandejas (now with CNN Philippines), Roderick Paulate, Vanessa del Bianco and Amy Perez. The show aired live from Studio 3 of ABS-CBN Broadcasting Center. This marks the return of Christine Jacob to ABS-CBN since she left when she was a co-host of now rival Eat Bulaga! which moved from the network to the rival GMA Network in 1995.

The show assumed most of the segments and staff from its predecessor "'Sang Linggo nAPO Sila" during its first season.  Meanwhile, former "Tropang Trumpo" director Edgar Mortiz also joined the show as the show's creative consultant. Among the most popular segments from APO's previous noontime show was "Calendar Girl", a daily pageant where girls 15–21 years of age participate in the talent and question and answer portions hosted by Estrada, Santiago and Revillame. To continue the chronology of the pageant (where monthly winners from January to December of the previous year converge to compete in the Grand Finals of following year), management decided to include the January–November monthly winners from the defunct "APO" show in the "MTB" grand coronation that happened on January 2, 1999.

In December 1998, "Pera o Bayong" (Money or Basket) debuted on TV as "MTB"'s highlight game portion. The engaging elimination round and the suspense-filled jackpot round won the hearts of most televiewers. It gave "MTB" better overall ratings than 'Sang Linggo nAPO Sila, and the show even overtook IBC's Chopsuey Espesyal (which later replaced by Alas Dose sa Trese and Lunch Break) and GMA's Eat Bulaga! as the top weekday noontime variety show from early 1999 until Revillame's ouster in 2001.  This led the management to cancel Sabado Live! on Saturday timeslot and replace it with "MTB"'s Saturday edition, which started to air on March 6, 1999.  Mortiz was promoted as the noontime show's new director along with Bobet Vidanes.

"MTB" also had its share of controversies. The "Calendar Girl" portion became notorious for the main hosts' green jokes which subsequently got warnings from MTRCB (then headed by veteran actress Armida Siguion-Reyna). Eventually, the ABS-CBN management intervened and suspended the three main hosts indefinitely. With their suspension in August 1999, the show was temporarily replaced by "Esep-Esep" for a week. Estrada, Santiago and Revillame came back with a bang after their suspension a week later.

In January 1, 2000, the show covers the millennium celebration at Times Square in New York City.

In the year 2000, the phenomenal game portion "Pera o Bayong" faced stiff competition from Eat Bulaga! when the long-running noontime show produced a segment called "Meron o Wala" (Something or Nothing). But despite the move from the rival show, "Pera o Bayong" still continued to enthrall viewers. The popular catchphrases coined by the hosts eventually became part of the Filipino pop culture.  Because of its immense popularity, "Pera o Bayong" was made into a movie version ("Pera o Bayong not da TV)" by Star Cinema that year, with the whole "MTB" cast included.

Changes were suddenly made after the February 7, 2001 episode, when main host Willie Revillame was axed from the show after citing creative differences between him and the staff. Matinee idols Marvin Agustin, Dominic Ochoa and Rico Yan (collectively known as "Whattamen") replaced him on the show. Top-notch stand-up comedians Marissa Sanchez and Ai-Ai delas Alas also joined the show as new female co-hosts. On March 12 of the same year, the show was reformatted without Revillame and it expanded to two hours on weekdays. "MTB" also started doing out-of-town shows abroad during that same year to promote ABS-CBN's international channel TFC.

In March 2002, "MTB" lost a co-host, Rico Yan, who died during his Lenten vacation in Dos Palmas Resort, Palawan. The show aired a week-long tribute for him.

That same year, the show introduced new faces to join the growing "MTB" family.  The quintet Power Boys, the dance group G-Girls, morning traffic angel Pia Guanio and upcoming teen star Maoui David were among those that joined in the fun and that time, Christine Jacob-Sandejas left the show to focus on her family, while original mainstay and regular voice-over announcer Gary Lim was also relieved from the show to focus on his acting career. During the 4th anniversary of the show in November 2002, the show underwent a major revamp with new game portions and some established ABS-CBN stars (Judy Ann Santos, Edu Manzano, Ryan Agoncillo) co-hosting on a weekly basis. By this time, the show had lost its luster in the ratings game to "Eat Bulaga!" following the rising popularity of the reality portion "Sige Ano Kaya Mo?" and creating new sensations out of the Sexbomb Dancers.

"Magandang Tanghali Bayan" ended its four-year run on February 21, 2003, coinciding with the departures of co-hosts Roderick Paulate and Amy Perez from the noontime slot to give way to Willie Revillame's TV comeback on the same timeslot. The title of the replacement show ("Masayang Tanghali Bayan") and Willie's co-hosts (among them Randy Santiago and John Estrada) were not revealed until 12:00nn of February 22, 2003.

Masayang Tanghali Bayan (2003–2004)
Prior to the start of the show, ABS-CBN drummed up month-long promotions for the show where they only revealed Willie Revillame, the JaBoom Twins and Cindy Kurleto as mainstays and had the audience guess the rest of his co-hosts thru a nationwide raffle promo. The title of the show was also kept under wraps as well.

It was on the initial telecast on February 22, 2003, when Willie Revillame revealed the title "Masayang Tanghali Bayan" and his co-hosts thru an elaborate opening number. He was joined by Randy Santiago, John Estrada, Dennis Padilla, Ai-Ai delas Alas, Bayani Agbayani, Mickey Ferriols and Aubrey Miles.  Resident comedians Tado and Bentong also came on board as well. The show was directed by ace TV director Johnny Manahan. The show had more game portions giving out big cash prizes thru "Super Jack en Poy" and "Urong Sulong" which gives out P2 million as the highest possible jackpot prize. It was also touted as the biggest noontime show of ABS-CBN, with a simultaneous airing on the Kapamilya Network's UHF channel, Studio 23.

Like its predecessor, the second version of "MTB" also courted controversy when John Estrada and Willie Revillame were suspended because of delivering their usual green jokes during the "Super Jack en Poy" jackpot round. The show's family also grew with the inclusion of former Kapuso comedians Long Mejia and Dagul.

However, before 2003 was about to end, Willie Revillame resigned from the show after a public outcry when he delivered a derogatory joke on midget co-host Mahal during her birthday.

The show continued to air until February 2004 with comedian Vhong Navarro and actor-host Edu Manzano taking over Willie's place. However, "Masayang Tanghali Bayan" failed to sustain viewership and was given the axe on February 20, 2004.

MTB Ang Saya Saya (2004–2005)
The ABS-CBN management capitalized on Ai-Ai delas Alas' rising popularity following her box-office triumph in Star Cinema's Ang Tanging Ina. She was named the main host, together with Edu Manzano and former GMA 7's resident game show host Arnell Ignacio in the third incarnation of MTB. Mickey Ferriols and Tado were also retained from the former show, and were joined by the Viva Hot Babes, and newcomers BJ Manalo, Jeni Hernandez and Empoy.

MTB Ang Saya Saya premiered on February 21, 2004, with more reality based talent search segments launched. TV Idol (You're the Man!) and "Luv Idol: Ur D Pair" gained popularity among the viewers and gave birth to the showbiz careers of Ahron Villena, AJ Dee and JE Estrada. The show also made household names out of Joross Gamboa, Roxanne Guinoo and Sandara Park fresh from their winning stints in the reality show Star Circle Quest. However, these efforts were overshadowed by rival "Eat Bulaga!" which celebrated its 25th anniversary on television with a Silver Special.

On November 15, 2004, MTB Ang Saya Saya lost its prime 12:00nn slot to Kris Aquino's Game Ka Na Ba? and started airing as an afternoon variety show on a 1:00 pm. time slot. Soon after, main host Edu Manzano resigned in January 2005 to concentrate on his duties as chairman of the Optical Media Board (OMB).

The show ended on February 4, 2005, and was replaced by Wowowee, hosted by Willie Revillame, who made his third comeback on the ABS-CBN noontime slot due to public clamor.

In January 2011, ABS-CBN announced through its Push.com site that a new noontime show, hosted by ex-MTB hosts Santiago and Estrada as well as Toni Gonzaga and ex-Wowowee host Mariel Rodriguez, was in the works. However, the new noontime show is called Happy Yipee Yehey!, which it premiered on February 12, 2011.

Segments

Pera o Bayong
Pera o Bayong became one of the more popular segments on MTB. The game's concept came from another Philippine TV show Kwarta o Kahon (Cash or Box) which aired Sundays on RPN.

The original version of the game started with 50 players (originally 36) answering a series of multiple choice questions (A, B, C, or D), hoping to eliminate all others until only one remains. The most popular type of question involved the scientific names of plants and animals, with at least two of the four choices noticeably joke answers.

If two people remain in the game and both choose the correct answer, the first person to arrive at his/her choice is declared the winner.

The winner of the elimination round then moves on to the jackpot round where he or she begins by choosing one of three bayongs marked M, T, or B (for the show's title) [But during the suspension of Santiago, Estrada and Revillame, M and T replaces with P and O]. Each bayong contain a concealed piece of cardboard on which is written what the contestant in playing for.

There is a bargaining session when the host (usually Willie Revillame) would offer cash (pera) in exchange for the contestant abandoning the prize hidden in the bayong.  After each offer, Amy Perez and Dick Paulate lead the crowd in asking "Pera o Bayong?" and the contestant declares his or her choice.

The number of bargaining sessions vary from day to day, depending on the mood/emotional status of both the host and the contestant. The prizes in the bayong would range from nothing, to electronics, to appliances, to a house and lot, to a showcase of the day, to a trip, to a tricycle, to a car, to fruits and vegetables (e.g. Watermelon), to food or to various cheaper objects and later to one million pesos on the reformat.

In its early days, the prize that was inside the chosen bayong was revealed to the audience during the sessions. Sometimes family members went to a TV inside the cafeteria at the ABS-CBN studios to see what the prize was, then try to influence the crowd to beg for the contestant to take whatever was in the bayong. After this was discovered the TV was switched off during the round. Later the prize was not revealed to anyone until it was actually opened.

There is a celebrity edition were the several celebrities (e.g. actors, actresses, singers and hosts) and/or prominent personalities (e.g. newscasters, reporters, athletes, disc jockeys and politicians) are playing every Saturday.

After the cancellation of MTB, an improved version of Pera o Bayong debuted as a part of Wowowee, retitled "Bigtime" Pera o Bayong.

This segment is also played in Happy Yipee Yehey!, with the same name.

The winner of the elimination round then moves on to the jackpot round where he or she begins by choosing one of 7 bayongs Each bayong contain a Contains 1 Or 0 Places on which is written what the contestant in playing for.

This segment is brought back as a digital game show on the Kumu app, produced by ABS-CBN Regional.

The game also Aired on the Launching of PIE Channel since May 26, 2022, as of the Programming Block, Pie-Nalo.

Calendar Girl
A pageant contest for beautiful girls aged 15 to 21 years old.  In the daily rounds, contestants paraded the MTB stage wearing a two-piece bikini/swimsuit while the weekly/monthly finals the pageant transforms into a more formal portion, with a grand "themed" opening number featuring contestants in various costumes, but still retaining the swimsuit portion.  The grand coronation of "Calendar Girls" airs usually on the first half of January, featuring all the monthly winners of the past year who will vie for the title.

The said portion gained notoriety, where the contestants were subjected to double-meaning questions and jokes thrown by main hosts Randy, John and Willie Revillame.  After their suspension, the daily contests was toned down, with the contestants wearing a cloth around their waists to cover the lower portion of their body.

Wansa Funny Taym
A comedy skit segment performed by the hosts and featuring a storyline. The storylines provided were mostly spoofs on Pop culture and everyday life.

Other segments
Other popular segments included: Sa Pula, Sa Puti (Tanggal ang Mali), Pakita Mo Puppet Mo, Munting Miss U, Super Lolo, Japorms, Mr. Ador-able, Wansa Funny Taym, Sing It, Milenyonaryo and Winner Take All.  When the show reformatted in the later years, other segments that made an impact were: Sing Alis, Ano Ka, Hilo?, Oo, Kaya Ko! and MTBGo.

Magandang Tanghali Bayan

 Cash Ng Bayan (1998-1999)
 Pera o Bayong (1998–2002)
 Calendar Girl (1999–2002)
 Munting Miss U
 Sa Pula, Sa Puti (Tanggal ang Mali)
 Winner Take All (2001–2002)
 Hula Bira
 Thaliataliada (2000)
 Pakita Mo Puppet Mo
 Super Lolo
 Japorms
 Mr. Ador-able
 Doble Karaoke (2001)
 Star Quest (The Nationwide Campus Singing Competition, The second incarnation for daily edition from 2000–2002, As part and the first incarnation original singing competition segment for Sunday edition of Sa Linggo nAPO Sila from 1989–1995)
 Wansa Funny Taym
 Sing It
 Coca Cola Pamaskong Payaman (Sponsored by Coca Cola)
 Milenyonaryo (2000)
 Awards Ka D'yan
 Loveli-Vanessa
 Hunk-A-Babe
 Magkapera Tayo sa Bahay
 Sing Alis (2001)
 Quiz Tayo
 Flawless de Mayo
 Ano Ka, Hilo?
 Oo, Kaya Ko!
 MTBGo
 Cash O Kaha
 Dance Alis
 Datsa Ratsa Money
 Make My Dare (Sponsored by Aquafresh)
 Atras o Abante
 Whattatext
 U-Ring, U-Win
 Pls. Konek
 Surveyvor
 Sagot Ng Bayan
 Todo Na 'To!
 WWW dat Ano?
 Sing A Gong
 Sing A Dunk
 Sakto!!
 Cheer Boom Bah
 Chicks in the City
 Kita Mo
 Pera Busog
 TOPSilog: The Beyblade Challenge
 Matira Ang Matibay: Challenge Sa Barangay
 Lucky Egg Mo
 Pasko Paksing Na Naman Muli
 Queen Of The World

Masayang Tanghali Bayan
 Super Jack en Poy
 Urong Sulong
 Mr. Suave
 Macho Garden/Planetang Tutong
 Sexy Flying Girls
 Joke, Joke, Joke
 Memorace
 Minus All
 1+1 Rambulan
 Mahal o Mura
 Front to Front to Front (Saturdays)

MTB Ang Saya Saya
 TV Idol (Monday - Saturday)
 Spin A Million (Monday - Wednesday - Friday)
 Global Pinay (Tuesday - Thursday - Saturday)
 Bilog Ang Mundo (Sponsored by Ginebra San Miguel)

Hosts

Magandang Tanghali Bayan
First airing date: November 30, 1998 
Last airing date: February 21, 2003

Main hosts
 Randy Santiago
 John Estrada
 Willie Revillame (1998–2001)

Co-hosts

 Roderick Paulate (1998–2003)
 Amy Perez (1998–2003) (now currently hosting It's Showtime)
 Bayani Agbayani (1998–2003) (now moved back to TV5)
 Bentong + (1998–2003, died in 2019)
 Bojo Molina (1998–2001)
 Gary Lim (1998–2002)
 Vanessa del Bianco (1998–2003)
 Carding Castro + (1998–1999) (died in 2003)
 Christine Jacob-Sandejas (1998–2001) (moved to CNN Philippines)
 Claudine Barretto (1998–2002)
 Jolina Magdangal (1998–2001) (moved to GMA Network and returned to ABS-CBN)
 G. Toengi
 Diether Ocampo (1998–1999, currently serves in the PH Navy)
 Wowie de Guzman (1998–1999)
 Belinda Panelo
 Dominic Ochoa (1999, 2001–2003)
 Kiray Celis (1999-2002) (moved to GMA Network)
 Carmina Villaroel (1999) (returned to GMA Network)
 Vina Morales (1999–2000) (now currently hosting ASAP Natin To)
 Rica Peralejo (1999–2002)
 Ai-Ai delas Alas (2000–2003) (returned to GMA Network)
 Paula Peralejo (2000–2002) (now currently married & also retired from showbiz)
 Camille Prats (2000–2003) (moved to GMA Network)
 Rico Yan + (2001–2002) (died in 2002)
 Marvin Agustin (2001–2003) (moved to GMA Network, moved to TV5 and returned to ABS-CBN)
 Angela Velez (2001–2003)
 Pia Guanio (2002–2003) (moved to GMA Network)
 Dennis Padilla (2002-2003)
 Michelle Bayle
 Karel Marquez (2002–2003)
 Aurora Halili
 The Powerboys
 Jordan Herrera
 Geoff Rodriguez
 Frank Garcia
 Jay Salas
 Greg Martin
 Marissa Sanchez
 Anne Curtis (2002) (now currently hosting It's Showtime)
 Chary Lopez
 Mylene Dizon
 Regine Tolentino
 Kaye Abad
 Melisa Henderson
 Maoui David
 Yuuki Kadooka (2002–2003)
 Judy Ann Santos (2002–2003)
 Bea Alonzo (2002-2003) (moved to GMA Network)

Masayang Tanghali Bayan
First airing date: February 22, 2003
Last airing date: February 20, 2004

Main hosts
 Randy Santiago
 John Estrada
 Willie Revillame (February–December 2003)

Co-hosts

 Ai-Ai delas Alas
 Amy Perez
 Aubrey Miles
 Cindy Kurleto
 Mahal + (died in 2021)
 Mura
 Mickey Ferriols
 Bayani Agbayani
 Dennis Padilla
 Long Mejia
 Bentong + (died in 2019)
 Tado Jimenez + (died in 2014)
 Angelica Jones
 Diether Ocampo
 Jericho Rosales
 Piolo Pascual
 Bernard Palanca
 Carlos Agassi
 Rica Peralejo
 Claudine Barretto
 Judy Ann Santos
 Kristine Hermosa
 Angeline Aguilar
 Bernard Cardona
 Assunta de Rossi
 Roselle Nava
 Sheryn Regis 
 Dagul
 JE Sison

MTB: Ang Saya Saya
First airing date: February 21, 2004 
Last airing date: February 4, 2005

Main hosts
 Ai-Ai delas Alas
 Edu Manzano
 Martin Nievera
 Arnell Ignacio

Co-hosts
 Mickey Ferriols
 Angelica Jones
 Vhong Navarro
 BJ Manalo
 Jenny Hernandez
 Tado Jimenez† 
 Empoy
 Bentong†
 Baby Bunot
 Viva Hot Babes
 Joross Gamboa
 Angeline Aguilar
 Archie Alemania
 Melissa Ricks
 Angelika dela Cruz
 Sheryn Regis
 Jasmine Trias
 Pokwang

The TV Idols
 Ahron Villena
 AJ Dee
 Marc Cortez
 JE Sison
 Kiko Matos

Directors
 Danni Caparas (1998–1999)
 Edgar Mortiz (Monday to Friday) (1999–2003)
 Bobet Vidanes (Saturday) (1999–2003)
 Willy Cuevas (for MTB Lenten Specials) (1999–2004)
 Johnny Manahan (Masayang Tanghali Bayan) (2003–2004)
 Arnel Natividad (MTB: Ang Saya Saya) (2004–2005)

See also
 List of programs broadcast by ABS-CBN
 Eat Bulaga!
 'Sang Linggo nAPO Sila
 Pilipinas Win Na Win
 Wowowee
 Happy Yipee Yehey!
 It's Showtime

In popular culture
Masayang Tanghali Bayan'''s "Flying Sexy Girl" segment was featured in one scene of the 2004 movie Volta also produced by Star Cinema.  In that scene, the movie's protagonist Perla (Ai-Ai delas Alas) decides to use her newly acquired powers as Volta to enter the contest and win a cash prize to help pay for sister Penny's (Pauleen Luna) hospital bills, much to the dismay of their brother Percy (Justin Cuyugan) who watched his sister's performance on his company office's television while on lunch break.

Pera o Bayong: Not da TV
Due to the phenomenal success of Pera o Bayong in 1999, ABS-CBN's film arm Star Cinema produced a movie "Pera o Bayong not da TV" with Edgar Mortiz directing and the whole cast of MTB'' included (sans Christine Jacob). Veteran actors Mark Gil, Paquito Diaz, Nanding Josef, Bayani Agbayani, Bentong, Norman Mitchell, Mike Gayoso, Hyubs Azarcon, Bangkay, Vangie Labalan and Bella Flores with very special participation of Noli de Castro, Ernie Baron, Marc Logan, Francis Pangilinan, Roderick Paulate and Amy Perez had pivotal roles in the movie while young actresses Tracy Vergel and Kristine Hermosa joined MTB mainstay Vanessa del Bianco as leading ladies to respective lead stars Willie Revillame, Randy Santiago and John Estrada. The movie was released on July 26, 2000.

References

ABS-CBN original programming
1990s Philippine television series
1998 Philippine television series debuts
2005 Philippine television series endings
Philippine variety television shows
Filipino-language television shows
Filipino-language films
2000 films